The Undead is a 1957 horror film directed by Roger Corman and starring Pamela Duncan, Allison Hayes, Richard Garland and Val Dufour. It also featured Corman regulars Richard Devon, Dick Miller, Mel Welles and Bruno VeSota. The authors' original working title was The Trance of Diana Love. The film  follows the story of a prostitute, Diana Love (Duncan), who is put into a hypnotic trance by psychic Quintis (Dufour), thus causing her to regress to a previous life.  Hayes later starred in Attack of the 50 Foot Woman (1958). The film was released on March 15, 1957 by American International Pictures as a double feature with Voodoo Woman.

Plot
Quintus, a psychic researcher who has spent seven years in Tibet, wants to send someone back in time into a past life. He hires (for $500) a prostitute, Diana Love, and plans to send her into a trance over 48 hours so she can access her past life.  Quintus' former professor is present to witness it.

Quintus puts Diana into a trance and sends her back into the Middle Ages, where she shares the body of her past self, Helene, who is in prison, sentenced to die at dawn under suspicion of being a witch.

At Diana's urging, Helene escapes prison, earning the attention of Livia (the witch for whose crimes Helene has been blamed) and of Satan himself. Via the psychic link between Diana and Helene, Quintus physically goes back in time to convince Helene to avoid her death, so he can witness the results of history changing.

However, if Helene evades execution, her future selves, including Diana, will never come into existence, so she accepts her fated death. When Helene dies, her link with Diana disappears, leaving Quintus physically stranded in the past, much to Satan's amusement.

Cast
Pamela Duncan as Diana Love/Helene
Richard Garland as Pendragon
Allison Hayes as Livia
Val Dufour as Quintus Ratcliff
Mel Welles as Smolkin
Dorothy Neumann as Meg-Maud
Billy Barty as The Imp
Bruno VeSota as Scroop
Aaron Saxon as Gobbo
Richard Devon as Satan
Dick Miller as The Leper
Paul Blaisdell as the corpse in the coffin

Production

Script
The Undead was inspired by an interest in reincarnation  during the 1950s (as was the film The She-Creature). Notably the book The Search for Bridey Murphy by Morey Bernstein was made into a film in 1956. Charles Griffith recalls:
It was originally called “The Trance of Diana Love”. Roger said to me, “Do me a Bridey Murphy picture.” And I told him that by the time Paramount finishes theirs, ours will fail. At the time, everybody was saying that they were making a bad picture. He just said that we’d get ours done ahead of theirs and clean up. So I did “The Trance of Diana Love” and it got shot funny, especially at the end, where you see the empty clothes before the revelation. It was in iambic pentameter and I had to rewrite it after it was ready to shoot because somebody told Roger that they didn’t understand it. Roger would give it to anybody to read or anybody out on the street. He’d send girls out with scripts.
Griffth later elaborated: "I separated all the different things with sequences with the devil, which were really elaborate, and the dialogue in the past was all in iambic pentameter. Roger got very excited by that. He handed the script around for everybody to read, but nobody understood the dialogue, so he told me to translate it into English. The script was ruined.

Mel Welles said "it was a wonderful script and it probably would have been the cult film rather than Little Shop of Horrors had it been shot that way. But either Roger or someone at American International Pictures didn't think it was commercially viable to do it that way and at the last minute a decision was made to rewrite the script without that."

By the time The Undead was being made, the popularity of reincarnation was starting to dwindle. Therefore, Corman decided that they needed to change it up a little and added the time travel elements of Quintis, and changed the title to The Undead.

Finance
In May 1956 Corman announced the movie was to be made for Walter Mirisch at Allied Artists.

In July 1956 Variety reported that Corman would fully finance the film himself, although it would be distributed by AIP.

Cast
Pamela Duncan says Roger Corman called her up "out of the blue" and offered her the lead. "I don't know what made him think of me except that he must have seen me in something; I worked a lot and I was on TV a lot." She later worked with Corman on Attack of the Crab Monsters.

Mel Welles called his role of Smolkin "one of the best characters I ever played. I played him kind of insane and what was wonderful was the one of my reviews compared me to Stanley Holloway in one of his Shakespearean gravedigger roles."

AIP's special effects artist Paul Blaisdell was drafted to play the corpse in the coffin in the graveyard scene, which he said was a lot of fun. His eyes however were supposed to remain open and staring throughout the scene, and he said it was difficult because little particles of the coffin lid kept falling into them like dust.

Shooting
Filming started 26 July 1956.

The movie was filmed in a converted supermarket, and was completed in only ten days, according to Griffith, costing $70,000. Duncan says it was shot in six days. Griffith has also said "it was fifty-five thousand dollars, fifteen trees with Spanish moss and a fog machine. That was a big deal for Roger then."

The bats that the imp and witch continually change into were left over from another Corman movie, It Conquered the World.

Griffith says the film was "a fun picture to shoot... We filled it [the supermarket] with palm trees and fog, and it was the first time Roger had used any of that stuff. He didn't like to rent anything. You could see the zipper on the witch's dress and all the gimmicks were very obvious and phony—Roger deliberately played to skid row, a degenerate audience."

Welles recalls "we almost died of asphixiation from all the creosote fog that was created in" the supermarket. Devon said "They had a bee-smoker to create the dreadful-smelling fog."

Some exteriors were shot at a place called The Witch House in Beverly Hills.

The movie was the first of several Devon made with Corman. However he did not enjoy The Undead, saying:
(Corman)'s temper was really quite awesome. On The Undead, someone had left one of my speeches out of the script, so naturally I couldn’t learn what wasn’t there. And he was not just upset, he was maniacal. Anything that cost a penny over his minuscule budget turned him into a monster... He was Just screaming his  head off. Everybody was telling him that it could be rectified, and I said [calmly], "Roger, it’s all right, don’t worry about it. We’ll get somebody to write it out on a card or something and I’ll read it." So one of the prop guys wrote it out on a little cardboard box and I read it. We did it in one take, and that was it. 
Devon also recalled that "Mel Welles just played everything off the top of his head and he came out all right, but it was difficult to keep from looking foolish. Pamela Duncan pressed very hard, and Dick Garland worked hard, too. but everything was against them as far as the dialogue was concerned. It was just coming down around their ears. Everybody that was on the show was quite professional and they really tried. They really put forth an effort."

Pamela Duncan says she enjoyed working with Corman.

Corman wanted to use a crypt to launch the film.

Critical reception
The Los Angeles Times called The Undead "a better than usual horror film... a rather imaginative yarn... for this type picture the acting is quite good... Corman has turned out a good product."

Variety called the film a minor league programmer, finding it technically proficient.

Legacy
The Undead was later featured on Mystery Science Theater 3000 during its eighth season where they comment on everything from small sets, tossing cats, bad dialog, and the horrors of having seen other Corman movies. It was also shown on the MeTV show Svengoolie on April 3, 2021 and again on December 18, 2021.

See also
 List of American films of 1957

References

External links

 
Joe Dante on The Undead at Trailers from Hell

1957 horror films
1957 films
American International Pictures films
American black-and-white films
Films set in the Middle Ages
1950s mystery films
Films directed by Roger Corman
American supernatural horror films
American mystery films
The Devil in film
Films about witchcraft
Films produced by Roger Corman
Films with screenplays by Charles B. Griffith
Films scored by Ronald Stein
Films about time travel
Films shot in Los Angeles County, California
1950s English-language films
1950s supernatural horror films
1950s American films